The 2007 Judgment Day was the ninth Judgment Day professional wrestling pay-per-view (PPV) event produced by World Wrestling Entertainment (WWE). It was held for wrestlers from the promotion's Raw, SmackDown!, and ECW brand divisions. The event took place on May 20, 2007, at the Scottrade Center in St. Louis, Missouri. This was the first Judgment Day event since 2003 to feature multiple brands.

The main match on the Raw brand, which was the card's main event, was John Cena versus The Great Khali for the WWE Championship, which Cena won after forcing Khali to submit to the STFU. The featured match on the SmackDown! brand was Edge versus Batista for the World Heavyweight Championship, which Edge won via pinfall with a school boy pin. The primary match on the ECW brand was a Handicap match for the ECW World Championship between Team McMahon (champion Vince McMahon, Shane McMahon, and Umaga) and Bobby Lashley. Lashley won the match by pinning Shane McMahon; however, he did not win the title since he did not pin the champion, Vince McMahon.

Production

Background
Judgment Day was first held by World Wrestling Entertainment (WWE) as the 25th In Your House pay-per-view (PPV) in October 1998. It then returned in May 2000 as its own event, establishing Judgment Day as the promotion's annual May PPV. The 2007 event was the ninth event in the Judgment Day chronology and was held on May 20 at the Scottrade Center in St. Louis, Missouri. While the previous three years' events exclusively featured wrestlers from the SmackDown! brand, the 2007 event featured wrestlers from the Raw, SmackDown!, and ECW brands, as following WrestleMania 23 in April, brand-exclusive pay-per-views were discontinued.

Storylines

The main feud heading into Judgment Day on the Raw brand was between John Cena and The Great Khali, with the two battling over the WWE Championship. The rivalry started on the April 30, 2007, episode of Raw during a non-title match between John Cena and Shawn Michaels when Michaels was attacked from behind by The Great Khali. Edge and Randy Orton were also knocked out by Khali. The Great Khali then performed a Khali Bomb on Cena. The next week on Raw, Khali defeated Michaels in a number one contenders match by knockout after executing the Khali Bomb on Michaels through the announce table. Later that night, Khali stole Cena's WWE title belt. On the May 14 episode of Raw, when Cena attempted to take his belt back, Khali attacked him.

The predominant feud on the SmackDown! brand was between Edge and Batista, with the two feuding over the World Heavyweight Championship. The feud started on the May 11 episode of SmackDown! when Batista challenged The Undertaker for the World Heavyweight Championship in a steel cage match. Both men escaped the steel cage at the same time, thus ending in a draw. After the match, Mark Henry made his return and attacked Undertaker. Edge then defeated Undertaker for the World Heavyweight Championship after cashing in his Money in the Bank contract, which is used to receive a title match of the owner's time and place of choosing. On the May 18 episode of SmackDown!, Batista confronted Edge and challenged him to a match for the World Heavyweight Championship at Judgment Day.

The primary feud on the ECW brand was between Team McMahon (Vince McMahon, Shane McMahon and Umaga) and Bobby Lashley, with Vince and Lashley feuding over the ECW World Championship. Lashley had represented Donald Trump in the "Battle of the Billionaires" and defeated Vince's representative Umaga, thus becoming a rival of the McMahons. The McMahons and Umaga defeated Lashley in a three-on-one handicap match to allow Vince to win the ECW World Championship. Lashley demanded a rematch for the ECW World Championship, and Vince booked himself, Umaga and Shane in another three-on-one handicap rematch against Lashley for the ECW title.

Event

Before the broadcast began, Kane defeated William Regal in a dark match.

Preliminary matches
The first televised match was between Ric Flair and Carlito. Carlito controlled most of the match, as he attacked and applied various submissions on Flair's arm. After reversing a Back Stabber, Flair forced Carlito to submit with the Figure-Four Leglock to win the match.

The next match on the card was between Bobby Lashley and Team McMahon (ECW World Champion Vince McMahon, Shane McMahon, and Umaga) for the ECW World Championship. Towards the end of the match, Lashley delivered a Dominator to Shane and pinned him for the win. Lashley was initially announced as the new ECW World Champion, but Vince declared that, since he had not been pinned, he was still the champion. Umaga then hit Lashley with a Samoan Spike.

The third match was between CM Punk and Elijah Burke. Throughout the match, the two exchanged many aerial maneuvers. Punk won the match by pinning Burke after performing a GTS (Go To Sleep).

The match between Randy Orton and Shawn Michaels followed. During an interview segment before the match, Orton attacked Michaels. Before the match began, Orton stood alone in the ring and declared himself the winner by forfeit. Michaels, however, appeared and came to the ring, although he showed signs of injury. Michaels came into the match with a legitimate knee injury. During the match, Orton tried to perform a superplex over the top turnbuckle, but Michaels used an eye rake and caused Orton to fall. Michaels followed up with a diving elbow drop and tried to execute Sweet Chin Music, but collapsed in the process. The referee declared Orton the winner as a result. After the match, Orton attacked Michaels again, causing a kayfabe career-threatening concussion.

Next was The Hardys (Matt and Jeff) versus Lance Cade and Trevor Murdoch for the World Tag Team Championship. Near the end of the match, Matt performed a Twist of Fate on Cade, which was followed by Jeff performing a Swanton Bomb. Jeff pinned Cade and The Hardys retained the World Tag Team Championship.

Main event matches
The next match was Edge versus Batista for the World Heavyweight Championship. Batista controlled most of the match and performed a Spinebuster on Edge. Edge, however, pinned Batista with a schoolboy, retaining the title.

The seventh match was a Two out of three falls match for the WWE United States Championship between champion Chris Benoit and Montel Vontavious Porter (MVP). MVP gained the first pinfall by pinning Benoit after executing a Playmaker. MVP gained the second fall and won the match after pinning Benoit with an Inside Cradle. This would mark the last time that Benoit would ever compete in a pay-per-view match.

Next was the main event, which saw John Cena defend the WWE Championship against The Great Khali. Khali attacked Cena early in the match, but Cena countered and gained the advantage. Cena performed a diving legdrop bulldog and followed it up by putting Khali in the STFU. Cena forced Khali to submit to the hold, but Khali's foot was under the rope, meaning Cena should have broken the hold. The referee, however, did not see this and declared Cena the winner. Cena retained the WWE Championship and gained possession of the belt, which Khali had kayfabe stolen prior to the event.

Aftermath
Bobby Lashley and Team McMahon continued their rivalry, as Mr. McMahon was forced to book himself against Lashley at One Night Stand in a Street Fight for the ECW World Championship. Lashley won the right to face McMahon by winning a Gauntlet match with the stipulation that he would receive a title shot if he beat Chris Masters, Viscera, Umaga and Shane McMahon in succession. At One Night Stand, Lashley defeated Mr. McMahon in a Street Fight to win the ECW World Championship despite interference by Shane McMahon and Umaga.

Edge and Batista also continued their rivalry over the World Heavyweight Championship after Batista defeated Mark Henry, Kane and Finlay in a Fatal Four-Way match to become the number one contender to the title. On the June 1 episode of SmackDown!, Batista verbally and physically confronted Edge on the SmackDown! debut of Edge's Cutting Edge talk show. At One Night Stand, Edge and Batista faced each other in a Steel cage match for the World Heavyweight Championship. Edge retained his title after escaping the steel cage first.

Shawn Michaels did not appear on-screen until October 8, when he returned to confront Orton and restart their feud. On the May 28 episode of Raw, Rob Van Dam claimed on WWE's website that Randy Orton should not have attacked Shawn Michaels at Judgment Day. Orton challenged Van Dam to a match that same night, which Orton won by forfeit. At One Night Stand, the two had a Stretcher match, which Van Dam won. After the match, Van Dam was attacked by Orton.

John Cena and The Great Khali also continued to feud over the WWE Championship. Following the controversial ending to their match at Judgment Day, where Cena forced Khali to submit while his foot was underneath the bottom rope, meaning Cena should have released the hold, Khali challenged Cena to a Falls Count Anywhere match for One Night Stand. Cena accepted, and Khali attacked him, performing a Chokebomb. At One Night Stand, Cena retained his title by pinning Khali after performing an FU off a crane.

This was the last Judgment Day ever to be in 4:3 format until January 2008 when it went to high definition.

Results

References

External links
Official Judgment Day 2007 website

Events in St. Louis
2007
2007 in Missouri
Professional wrestling in St. Louis
2007 WWE pay-per-view events
May 2007 events in the United States